The 2002 Delaware Fightin' Blue Hens football team represented the University of Delaware as a member of the Atlantic 10 Conference (A-10) during the 2002 NCAA Division I-AA football season. Led by first-year head coach K. C. Keeler, the Fightin' Blue Hens compiled an overall record of 6–6 with a mark of 4–5 in conference play, placing in a three-way tie for sixth in the A-10. The team played home games at Delaware Stadium in Newark, Delaware. Keeler succeeded Tubby Raymond, who retired as head coach in 2001 after helming the team for 36 seasons.

Schedule

Roster

References

Delaware
Delaware Fightin' Blue Hens football seasons
Delaware Fightin' Blue Hens football